Carl Sebastian Hugosson Tamm (1 December 1889 – 26 September 1962) was a Swedish rower who competed in the 1912 Summer Olympics.

He was a member of the Swedish boat Roddklubben af 1912 which was eliminated in the quarterfinals of the men's eight tournament.

References

1889 births
1962 deaths
Swedish male rowers
Olympic rowers of Sweden
Rowers at the 1912 Summer Olympics
Tamm family